John Walter Milne (4 June 1907 in Buffalo, New York, United States – 6 December 1995 in Pasadena, California, United States) was an international Speedway rider. He became the first American to win a motorcycling world championship when he won the Speedway World Championship in 1937 (defeating brother Cordy Milne into third place). Milne finished as runner-up in the World Championship in 1938.

Early life
Milne's family moved to Pasadena, California, while he was still young. By the early 1930s, Cordy Milne had started to earn some decent money in racing. Jack decided that if he and his brother raced and shared expenses, they could earn a living from the sport. Jack sold his service station and purchased a pair of Comerford-JAP Speedway racing machines from England.

Career
The Milne brothers were invited to England, where speedway was very popular. Cordy signed up to ride for the Hackney Wick Wolves, Jack for the New Cross Tamers. They became celebrities, appearing on trading cards and being featured in advertisements for a variety of products. Milne won the London Riders' Championship in 1937 and 1939.

Jack Milne, Cordy Milne and fellow American Wilbur Lamoreaux also toured Australia on many occasions. In 1936/37 they were joined by Earl Farrand, Byrd McKinney, Pete Colman and Garland Johnson in representing the USA in test matches against the Australians. Jack Milne also won the 1937 Australian 3 Lap Championship as well as the 1937 New South Wales State Championship at the famous Sydney Showground Speedway.

Milne reached the final of the Speedway World Championship three times, never finishing lower than tenth place and was in fifth place after the semi-finals in 1939 when World War II broke out and the final was never run. He returned to Pasadena with his brother and opened a bicycle shop with $4,000 from their racing earnings. The business grew to include a motorcycle dealership and later the Milnes expanded to a major car dealership in the Los Angeles area.

Legacy
After the war, the brothers helped revive American Speedway racing in Southern California including Costa Mesa Speedway which has been operating continuously since 1969 to this day, and Milne won his last two American National titles.

As a former Speedway World Champion and previous winner at Wembley Stadium Jack Milne was a special guest at the 1981 World Final at Wembley Stadium, the last to be held at the famous venue. There he saw Bruce Penhall became the first American to win the World Championship since Milne had done so in 1937 breaking a drought of 43 years for American riders.

In 1998, Jack Milne was inducted into the AMA Motorcycle Hall of Fame.  In the same year, the Jack Milne Cup was inaugurated to honour the life of the former World Champion; it is still held annually at Costa Mesa Speedway

World Final Appearances
 1936 -  London, Wembley Stadium - 10th - 15pts
 1937 -  London, Wembley Stadium - Winner - 28pts
 1938 -  London, Wembley Stadium - 2nd - 21pts

Players cigarette cards
Milne is listed as number 31 of 50 in the 1930s Player's cigarette card collection.

References 

1907 births
1995 deaths
American speedway riders
Individual Speedway World Champions
Sportspeople from Buffalo, New York
New Cross Rangers riders